The 6th West Virginia Infantry Regiment  was an infantry regiment that served in the Union Army during the American Civil War.

Service
The 6th West Virginia Infantry Regiment was mustered into Federal service on August 13, 1861, at Grafton, Mannington, Cairo, Parkersburg and Wheeling, in western Virginia.

The regiment spent most of its service guarding the Baltimore & Ohio railroad line, fighting numerous small skirmishes against Confederate raiders and bushwhackers.

The regiment was mustered out of Federal service on June 10, 1865.

Casualties
The 6th West Virginia Infantry Regiment suffered 8 enlisted men killed or fatally wounded in battle and 2 officers and 167 enlisted men dead from disease, for a total of 177 fatalities.

See also
West Virginia Units in the Civil War
West Virginia in the Civil War

References
The Civil War Archive

Units and formations of the Union Army from West Virginia
1861 establishments in Virginia
Military units and formations established in 1861
Military units and formations disestablished in 1865